Frank Harold Shaw (1882 – May 14, 1950) was an American civil engineer notable for designing bridges and water supply infrastructure in Lancaster County, Pennsylvania. Two water towers that he designed, affectionately named "George and Martha" by local residents, were landmarks on the Lancaster skyline until their demolition in 1996.

Projects
1916 Big Chickies Bridge
1916 Weaverland Bridge (Quarry Road Bridge)
1917 Bridge in West Earl Township (Big Conestoga Creek Bridge No. 12)
1925 
1932

References

External links

1882 births
1950 deaths
American civil engineers
American bridge engineers
People from Lancaster, Pennsylvania
Engineers from Pennsylvania
20th-century American engineers